A srbulјa, srbulje in plural, is a liturgical book written or printed in the Serbian recension of Old Serbian (Serbo-Balkanic), which was the written language of Serbs from the 12th century to the 1830s. The term was used for the first time by Vuk Karadžić in 1816 to differentiate liturgical books written in the Serbian recension from those written in the Russian recension, which gradually replaced srbulje at the beginning of the 19th century.

Until the end of the 15th century srbulje were only written books. Since 1494 (Cetinje Octoechos) until 1570 several printing houses printed srbulje.

Etymology 

The oldest mention of the term is in a letter to Jernej Kopitar by Vuk Karadžić on 1 August 1816. One of the reasons for designating a particular name for old printed or written Serbian language books was to differentiate them from the Russian language liturgical books.

History 

Srbulje were published in printed form in the 15th and 16th centuries. The history of printing of early Serbian language books is connected with historical situation on the territory populated by Serbs. When printing press was invented significant part of this territory was captured by Ottoman Empire which subjected Christian population to process of islamization. The printing of Serbian language books had a mission to resist to the islamization of the Serbs and to preserve their identity as internal enemies of the Ottoman Empire. Faced with danger from the Ottoman Empire, Venice and Vatican tolerated to certain extent activities of Serbian diaspora and printing of srbulje.

The first book printed on Serbian language is Cetinje Octoechos which is of exceptional importance as the first book printed on Serbian language. It was printed by Hieromonk Makarije in the Crnojević printing house, established Đurađ Crnojević in Zeta.

During 16th century srbulje were printed in many other printing shops, including Serbian Venetian Printing House, Goražde printing house, Rujno Monastery printing house and many other. Most of printing houses were established in churches and monasteries, which was by some scholars perceived as an evidence that Serbian Orthodox Church still received significant income, although Serbia was under Ottoman Empire. The Ottomans were opposed to the printing of the books generally, and especially to Christian liturgical books. According to some authors, printing houses were deliberately established in remote churches and monasteries like in case of Mrkšina crkva printing house, Rujno Monastery printing house and Goražde printing house, to hide their activities from the Ottomans. 

Jerolim Zagurović and Vićenco Vuković were the last printers of printed srbulje. There was only one book printed in 1638 in Venice by Bartholomew Ginami, but that was only a reprint of psalter with book of hours published by Zagurović in 1569.

Early 19th century collecting 
At the beginning of the 19th century collectionaries from many different countries, including Vuk Karadžić, collected srbulje. In Montenegro and Herzegovina this task was performed by Vuk Popović (priest from Kotor) and Vuk Vrčević, on behalf of Vuk Karadžić.  Vuk Popović received from Vuk Karadžić new liturgical books printed on Serbian language and exchanged them for srbulje. Three Vuks (Karadžić, Popović and Vrčević) with support of Russian scholars collected almost all remaining srbulje from Montenegro. Besides from Montenegro, Vuk Karadžić also received srbulje from Dalmatia, Zadar, Osijek, Sombor, etc... Every time he travelled to Serbia Karadžić would use the opportunity to visit monasteries and prepare lists of their old liturgical books. This activities were not always welcomed by the people in service of knjaz Miloš Obrenović in Kragujevac.

Replacing with Russian books 
The influence of Russian language liturgical books began back in 1726 when Russian graduate teachers from Kyiv Mohyla Academy arrived at Sremski Karlovci's newly established Slavonic-Latin-Greek schools. Based on the monastic rules of Vikentije Jovanović (Metropolitan of Karlovci) liturgical books had to be written in Russian. At the beginning of 19th century srbulje became scarce so churches had to import and use Russian language liturgical books. During 1830s srbulje were replaced with books written in Russian language.

See also 
 Serbian manuscripts

References

Sources 

 
 
 
 
 
 
 
 
 *

Further reading

 
 Радослав Грујић: „Србуље у бившем Вараждинском Генералату"
 Milan M. Vukicevic, "Iz starih Srbulja" GZM XIII (1901): 31-70 and 289-350
 Mita Živković, "Srbulje u Sarajevu," Glasnik Srpskog Učenog Društva LXIII (Belgrade, 1885)
 Dobrašinović, G. (1999) Vuk i Srbulje. Sveske Matice srpske - građa i prilozi za kulturnu i društvenu istoriju, 36, 50
 Milosavljević Vera, charter Srbulje pod embargom published in Letopis Matice Srpske, Volume 455, 5 May 1955

Cyrillic script
Serbian language
Medieval Serbian texts
Church Slavonic literature